is a Japanese actress, model and tarento.

Filmography

Film
 Ju-on: The Beginning of the End (2014), Yayoi
 Strobe Edge (2015), Mao Sugimoto
 Ju-on: The Final (2015), Yayoi
 Ashita ni Nareba. (2015), Miki Sasaki
 Strayer's Chronicle (2015), Aoi
 At Home (2015), Asuka Moriyama
 Nagareboshi ga Kienai Uchini (2015), Eri Motoyama
 Oke Rojin (2016), Kazune Nonomura
 Sagrada Reset: Part 1 (2017), Misora Haruki
 Sagrada Reset: Part 2 (2017), Misora Haruki
 Principal (2018), Shima Sumitomo
 Talking the Pictures (2019), Umeko Kurihara
 12 Suicidal Teens (2019), Meiko
 The End of the Pale Hour (2022), she
 Fullmetal Alchemist: The Revenge of Scar (2022), Lan Fan
 Fullmetal Alchemist: The Final Alchemy (2022), Lan Fan

Television
 Dinner Episode 9 (Fuji TV, 2013)
 Aoi Honō (TV Tokyo, 2014), Hiromi Tsuda
 Mago no Namae: Ōgai Papa no Meimei Sōdō 7-kakan (NHK BS Premium, 2014)
 Gomenne Seishun! (TBS, 2014), Takako Nakai
 Massan (NHK, 2014–2015), Hideko Nakamura
 Kiseki no Dōbutsuen: Asahiyama Dōbutsuen Monogatari 2015 Inochi no Baton (Fuji TV, 2015), Akiko Natsuki
 Hana Moyu (NHK, 2015), Takasugi Masa
 Ichiban Densha ga Hashitta (NHK, 2015), Toyoko Amada
 Samurai Sensei (TV Asahi, 2015), Sachiko Akagi
 The Girl Who Leapt Through Time (NTV, 2016), Mihane Yoshiyama
 Natsume Sōseki no Tsuma (NHK, 2016)
 Tokyo Sumikko Gohan (Wowow, 2017)
 Ashi Girl (NHK, 2017), Yui Hayakawa
 Idaten (NHK, 2019), Tomie Murata
 Scarlet (NHK, 2020)
 Ju-On: Origins (Netflix, 2020)
 Chimudondon (NHK, 2022)
 One Night, She Thinks of the Dawn (Amazon Prime Video, 2022), she
 The Black Swindler (TBS, 2022)

Commercials
 Benesse - Shinken Zemi Kōkō Kouza (2013)
 NTT DoCoMo (2013-)
 Point - Lowrys Farm (2014-)
 Mizuho Bank - Aeonbank ATM Renkei-hen (2014-)
 Kuraray - Mirabakesso (2014-)
 Calpis - Calpis Water (2015)

Awards

References

External links 
 Yuina Kuroshima Profile at Sony Music Artists
 

Japanese television personalities
Japanese female models
Sony Music Entertainment Japan artists
People from Okinawa Prefecture
1997 births
Living people
21st-century Japanese actresses
Ryukyuan people
Asadora lead actors